The 1944 All-Big Ten Conference football team consists of American football players selected to the All-Big Ten Conference teams selected by the Associated Press (AP) and United Press (UP) for the 1944 Big Ten Conference football season.

All Big-Ten selections

Ends
 Jack Dugger, Ohio State (AP-1; UP-1)
 Frank Bauman, Purdue (AP-1; UP-1)
 Duane F. Sickels, Northwestern (UP-2)
 Art Renner, Michigan (UP-2)

Tackles
 Milan Lazetich, Michigan (AP-1; UP-1)
 Bill Willis, Ohio State (AP-1; UP-1)
 Clement Bauman, Michigan (UP-2)
 Pat O'Brien, Purdue (UP-2)

Guards
 Bill Hackett, Ohio State (AP-1; UP-1)
 Ralph Serpico, Illinois (AP-1; UP-1)
 Ray Justak, Northwestern (UP-2)
 John Davey, Wisconsin (UP-2)

Centers
 John Tavener, Indiana (AP-1; UP-1)
 Gordon Appleby, Ohio State (UP-2)

Quarterbacks
 Les Horvath, Ohio State (AP-1 [halfback]; UP-1)
 Joe Ponsetto, Michigan (AP-1; UP-2)

Halfbacks
 Buddy Young, Illinois (AP-1; UP-1)
 Wayne A. Williams, Minnesota (UP-2)
 Bob Hoernschemeyer, Indiana (UP-2)

Fullbacks
 Babe Dimancheff, Purdue (AP-1 [fullback]; UP-1)
 Bob Wiese, Michigan (AP-2; UP-1)
 George M. Sundheim, Indiana (UP-2)

Key

AP = Associated Press, chosen by conference coaches

UP = United Press

Bold = Consensus first-team selection of both the AP and UP

See also
1944 College Football All-America Team

References

1944 Big Nine Conference football season
All-Big Ten Conference football teams